Tyler Davis Barnhardt (born January 13, 1993) is an American actor. He is known for his roles as Matthew Roe in the American period drama television series Underground and Charlie St. George in the American teen drama streaming television series 13 Reasons Why.

Early life and education 
Barnhardt was born in Raleigh, North Carolina, and was raised in Matthews, a suburb of Charlotte. He graduated from David W. Butler High School in 2011. Barnhardt earned a bachelor of fine arts degree in theatre from the University of North Carolina at Greensboro's School of Music, Theatre and Dance in 2015.

Career 
In 2016 Barnhardt appeared on an episode of Turn: Washington's Spies. In 2017 Barnhardt was cast as Matthew Roe in the second season of the television series Underground and had a small role on the show Scorpion. In 2019 he was cast as Charlie St. George on the American streaming television series 13 Reasons Why, making his debut in the third season. Later in 2019 he was cast as a main character in the television drama series Tales from the Loop.

In November 2019 Barnhardt was featured on the cover of Visual Tales magazine.

Filmography

References

External links 
 

Living people
1993 births
21st-century American male actors
American male television actors
Actors from Raleigh, North Carolina
Male actors from Charlotte, North Carolina
People from Matthews, North Carolina
University of North Carolina at Greensboro alumni